Schuchert can refer to:

Charles Schuchert (1858–1942), US invertebrate paleontologist
Charles Schuchert Award, award named in honor of the above, given by the Paleontological Society
Peter Schuchert, marine biologist and founder of the World Hydrozoa Database

Cape Schuchert Formation, a Silurian rock formation in Greenland
Schuchert Dal Formation, a Permian rock formation in Greenland